The 1972–73 NBA season was the Hawks' 24th season in the NBA and fifth season in Atlanta. The team moved their home games from the Alexander Memorial Coliseum to The Omni Coliseum.  The Hawks registered a 46–36 record during the regular-season, but went 2–4 against the Boston Celtics in postseason.

Offseason

Draft picks

Roster

Regular season

Record vs. opponents

Game log

Playoffs

|- align="center" bgcolor="#ffcccc"
| 1
| April 1
| @ Boston
| L 109–134
| Lou Hudson (28)
| Jim Washington (14)
| Hudson, Maravich (5)
| Boston Garden11,907
| 0–1
|- align="center" bgcolor="#ffcccc"
| 2
| April 4
| Boston
| L 113–126
| Pete Maravich (34)
| Walt Bellamy (11)
| Pete Maravich (10)
| Omni Coliseum11,588
| 0–2
|- align="center" bgcolor="#ccffcc"
| 3
| April 6
| @ Boston
| W 118–105
| Lou Hudson (37)
| Walt Bellamy (12)
| Pete Maravich (11)
| Boston Garden15,320
| 1–2
|- align="center" bgcolor="#ccffcc"
| 4
| April 8
| Boston
| W 97–94
| Pete Maravich (37)
| Jim Washington (15)
| Herm Gilliam (7)
| Omni Coliseum11,675
| 2–2
|- align="center" bgcolor="#ffcccc"
| 5
| April 11
| @ Boston
| L 101–108
| Pete Maravich (34)
| Walt Bellamy (16)
| Herm Gilliam (6)
| Boston Garden12,525
| 2–3
|- align="center" bgcolor="#ffcccc"
| 6
| April 13
| Boston
| L 103–121
| Lou Hudson (35)
| Washington, Bellamy (13)
| Bellamy, Gilliam (5)
| Omni Coliseum16,181
| 2–4
|-

Awards and records
Pete Maravich, All-NBA Second Team

References

Atlanta
Atlanta Hawks seasons
Atlanta
Atlanta